The Clark–Robidoux House is a historic house located on 4th Street in Wallace, Kansas. It was listed on the National Register of Historic Places in 2001; the listing included two contributing buildings.

Description and history 
The two-story house was built around 1880. It was deemed significant for historic association with growth of Wallace and Wallace County, for its architecture, which is Gothic Revival, and for its association with Harding Allen Clark (1852–1923) and Peter Robidoux (1850–1927).

References

Houses on the National Register of Historic Places in Kansas
Gothic Revival architecture in Kansas
Houses completed in 1880
Houses in Wallace County, Kansas
National Register of Historic Places in Wallace County, Kansas